Jewish Center of Coney Island, also known as the Jewish Center of Brighton Beach, is a historic synagogue and community center located in the Brighton Beach neighborhood of Brooklyn, Kings County, New York. The synagogue was built in 1929–1930, and is a four-story-with-basement trapezoidal shaped building in the Renaissance Revival style.  The front facade is clad in golden-colored stone and features a grand staircase and second story loggia.  The building is capped by a hipped roof of red tile.

It was listed on the National Register of Historic Places in 2013.

References

External links
Jewish Center of Brighton Beach website

Synagogues in Brooklyn
Brighton Beach
Properties of religious function on the National Register of Historic Places in Brooklyn
Synagogues on the National Register of Historic Places in New York City
Synagogues completed in 1930
1930 establishments in New York City
Renaissance Revival synagogues